The River Keer is a river in north west England.

Keer might also refer to:
Anant Viththal Keer (pen name "Dhananjay Keer"), biographer from Maharashtra, India 
Caroline Keer, a British military nurse and nursing administrator
Girija Keer, a Marathi writer from Maharashtra, India
Leon Keer, a Dutch pop-surrealist artist
Kheer, a type of pudding from the Indian Subcontinent